Norbert Farkas (born 29 June 1992) is a Hungarian professional footballer who plays for Tiszakécske FC.

Club statistics

Updated to games played as of 16 December 2018.

References

External links

HLSZ 

1992 births
Living people
Sportspeople from Székesfehérvár
Hungarian footballers
Hungary youth international footballers
Hungary under-21 international footballers
Association football midfielders
Puskás Akadémia FC players
Zalaegerszegi TE players
BFC Siófok players
Balmazújvárosi FC players
MTK Budapest FC players
Monori SE players
Mosonmagyaróvári TE 1904 footballers
Tiszakécske FC footballers
Nemzeti Bajnokság I players